The 2014–15 Cyprus Basketball Division A was the 48th season of the Cyprus Basketball Division A, the top-tier level professional basketball league on Cyprus. The season started on November 1, 2014, and ended April 21, 2015. AEK Larnaca won the national championship.

Regular season

Rounds 1-12

Rounds 13-18

Playoffs

References

Cyprus
Basketball
Basketball
Cyprus Basketball Division 1